Theo Pijper (born 11 February 1980) is a Dutch motorcycle speedway rider.

Career
Born in Dokkum, Netherlands, Pijper first rode a motorbike at the age of five. He was a successful long track rider before starting his speedway career. He made his debut in British speedway in 2002 with Edinburgh Monarchs, staying with the team until 2007 in a spell that included a Premier League title in 2003. In 2004 he won the European Grasstrack Championship at Eenrum. 

In 2007 he moved up to the Elite League with Wolverhampton Wolves, but after losing his place in the team returned to the Monarchs for a short spell, later moving to Berwick Bandits. He lost his team place once again, but later that season won the European Grasstrack Championship for a second time. He joined Elite League team Swindon Robins in 2008, but lost his place in June, going on to a spell with Mildenhall Fen Tigers in the Premier League. 

He returned to British speedway in 2011 with Glasgow Tigers, with whom he won the Premier League in both 2011 and 2012, and also signed with Elite League Birmingham Brummies as their number eight.

In 2012 he returned to the Edinburgh Monarchs team, and was part of the 2013 Premier League Four-Team Championship winning team. In 2018 he signed to ride for the Redcar Bears.

After a season with Scunthorpe in 2021 he rejoined Berwick Bandits for the SGB Championship 2022.

World Longtrack

Grand Prix Years
 1998 - 1 app (25th) 3pts
 1999 - 2 app (14th) 23pts
 2000 - 5 app (14th) 30pts
 2001 - 4 app (6th) 45pts
 2002 - 5 app (5th) 72pts
 2003 - 6 app (6th) 64pts
 2004 - 5 app (5th) 63pts
 2005 - 3 app (7th) 40pts
 2006 - 3 app (4th) 48pts
 2007 - 3 app (7th) 36pts
 2008 - 4 app (5th) 55pts
 2009 - 5 app (6th) 75pts
 2010 - 6 app (Second) 120pts
 2001 - 6 app (4th) 96pts
 2012 - 6 app (4th) 124pts
 2013 - 6 app (14th) 52pts
 2014 - 2 app (11th) 31pts
 2015 - 4 app (4th) 61pts
 2016 - 5 app (4th) 83pts
 2017 - 5 app (6th) 63pts
 2018 - 5 app (6th) 64pts
 2019 - 5 app (6th) 66pts
 2018 - 2 app (6th) 26pts
 2021 - 2 app (Third) 24pts
 2022 - 5 app (6th) 61pts

Grand-Prix podiums
  Vechta First 2008,Second 2006
  Forus First 2011
  New Plymouth Second 2004
  Morizes Second 2011, Third 2013
  Eenrum Second 2010
  Scheeßel Third 2001
  Mühldorf Third 2005
  St Macaire Third 2010
  Marmande Third 2010
  Forssa Third 2012
  Groningen Third 2012

European Grasstrack Championship 
 1999  Werlte (NS)
 2000 Did not compete
 2001  Noordwolde (4th) 18pts
 2002  Berghaupten (5th) 19pts
 2003  La Reole (6th) 16pts
 2004  Eenrum (Champion) 19pts
 2005 Did not compete
 2006  La Reole (Second) 18pts
 2007  Folkestone (Champion) 16pts
 2008 Did not compete
 2009  Berghaupten (6th) 13pts
 2010  La Reole (Second) 12pts
 2011  Skegness (10th) 10pts
 2012 Semi-finalist
 2013 Did not compete
 2014 Did not compete
 2015 Semi-finalist

Personal life
His son Ace Pijper is also a professional speedway rider.

References

1980 births
Living people
Dutch speedway riders
Swindon Robins riders
Edinburgh Monarchs riders
Berwick Bandits riders
Mildenhall Fen Tigers riders
People from Dantumadiel
Sportspeople from Friesland